Pupillidae is a family of mostly minute, air-breathing, land snails, terrestrial pulmonate gastropod mollusks or micromollusks in the superfamily Pupilloidea. 

This family has two subfamilies (according to the taxonomy of the Gastropoda by Bouchet & Rocroi, 2005).: Pupillinae W. Turton, 1831 and Pupoidinae Iredale, 1940.

Distribution 
Pupoides marginatus is endemic to Cuba. The type genus, Pupilla, in direct contrast, has numerous living and extinct species found in Europe, Northern Africa, North America and South-East Asia.

Anatomy
In this family, the number of haploid chromosomes lies between 26 and 30 (according to the values in this table).

Genera 
Genera within the family Pupillidae include:
 † Albertanella Russell, 1931 
 Subfamily Pupillinae W. Turton, 1831
 Gibbulinopsis Germain, 1919
 Microstele O. Boettger, 1886
 Omegapilla Iredale, 1937
 Pupilla Fleming, 1828 - type genus of the family Pupillidae
 Subfamily Pupoidinae Iredale, 1940
 Corena A. Adams, 1870
 Glyptopupoides Pilsbry, 1926
 Pupoides Pfeiffer, 1854
 Pupoidopsis Pilsbry & Cooke, 1920
Genera brought into synonymy
 Australbinula Pilsbry, 1916: synonym of Gastrocopta Wollaston, 1878 (junior synonym)
 Famarinia Iredale, 1933: synonym of Glyptopupoides Pilsbry, 1926 (invalid: nomen nudum)
 Gyrodaria Iredale, 1940: synonym of Gastrocopta Wollaston, 1878
 Leucochila E. von Martens, 1860: synonym of Pupoides L. Pfeiffer, 1854
 Leucochiloides L. Pfeiffer, 1879: synonym of Pupoides L. Pfeiffer, 1854
 Papualbinula Iredale, 1941: synonym of Australbinula Pilsbry, 1916: synonym of Gastrocopta Wollaston, 1878
 † Paracoryna Flach, 1890: synonym of Pupilla J. Fleming, 1828 (junior synonym)
 Pupa Draparnaud, 1801: synonym of Pupilla J. Fleming, 1828 (invalid: junior homonym of Pupa Röding, 1798)
 Sterkia Pilsbry, 1898 / or in Vertiginidae: synonym of Vertigo O. F. Müller, 1773
 Themapupa Iredale, 1930: synonym of Pupoides L. Pfeiffer, 1854
 Torquatella Held, 1838: synonym of Pupilla J. Fleming, 1828
 Wallivertilla Iredale, 1937: synonym of Cylindrovertilla O. Boettger, 1881 (junior synonym)

References

External links 

 Bieler, R. & Slapcinsky, J. (2000). A case study for the development of an island fauna: Recent terrestrial mollusks of Bermuda. Nemouria. 44: 1-99

 
Taxa named by William Turton